Amir Hossain Amu (born 1 January 1940) is a Bangladeshi politician, the incumbent Member of Parliament from Jhalokati-2, and served as the Minister of Industries during 2014–2018. He is currently the coordinator and spokesman for the Awami League-led 14-party Grand Alliance.

Birth and education 
Amu was born on 1 January 1940 in Jhalakathi subdivision of Barisal district. His father Mohammad Moazzem Hossain and mother Aklima Khatun. He obtained BA from Barisal BM College in 1965 and LLB from Barisal Law College in 1968. He earned graduation degree in history from the University of Dhaka.

Career
On 23 July 2003, Amu's house in Jhalokati District was vandalized by Bangladesh Nationalist Party activists who destroyed the boundary, door, and windows of the house.

When party president Sheikh Hasina Wajed was exiled by the Caretaker government of Bangladesh (2006–08), Amu became one of top leaders who preserved and represented the party in her absence.

However, he also developed differences with Hasina, criticising her for making a pact with the Islamist Khelafat Majlish party despite the Awami League's policy of secularism, and not discussing it first with other party leaders. Sheikh Hasina in turn criticised Amu for appearing supportive of the caretaker government. He was the minister of Industries.

References

Living people
1940 births
Awami League politicians
Industries ministers of Bangladesh
9th Jatiya Sangsad members
10th Jatiya Sangsad members
11th Jatiya Sangsad members
People from Jhalokati district
20th-century Bengalis
21st-century Bengalis